La Rue-Saint-Pierre is a commune in the Seine-Maritime department in the Normandy region in northern France. It belongs to the Arrondissement of Rouen and the Canton of Le Mesnil-Esnard (until 2015 Canton of Clères). The inhabitants are called Bocassiens .

Geography
La Rue-Saint-Pierre is surrounded by the neighboring villages of Yquebeuf in the north, Estouteville-Écalles in the north-east, Vieux-Manoir in the east, Longuerue in the south-east, Pierreval in the south, Saint-André-sur-Cailly in the west and southwest, and Cailly in the north-west.

The A28 autoroute passes through the commune's south-eastern section.

Politics and Administration

Population

Places of interest
 The church of St. Pierre, dating from the sixteenth century.
 A chapel and manor house at Mesnil-Godefroy.

See also
Communes of the Seine-Maritime department

References

Communes of Seine-Maritime